is a passenger railway station in the town of Yorii, Saitama, Japan, operated by the private railway operator Tōbu Railway.

Lines
There are no direct trains to or from Ikebukuro.

Station layout
The station consists of an island platform serving two tracks. Entrances to the station are provided on both the east and west sides, with the ticket barriers located at the south (up) end of the platform.

A storage loop used for track maintenance equipment lies to the east of the station on the site of what was formerly a freight yard.

Platforms

Adjacent stations

History
The station opened on July 10, 1925.

From 17 March 2012, station numbering was introduced on the Tōbu Tōjō Line, with Obusuma Station becoming "TJ-35".

The station building was formerly located on the east (up) side of the tracks, connected to the platforms by an overhead footbridge, with no access to the station from the west side. Prior to rebuilding, the remains of a former side platform also lay on the west side of the station.

Work to rebuild the station commenced in June 2014, and was completed in July 2016, with entrances on both east and west sides of the station and a new footbridge.

Passenger statistics
In fiscal 2019, the station was used by an average of 1685 passengers daily.

Surrounding area

See also
 List of railway stations in Japan

References

External links

  

Railway stations in Saitama Prefecture
Railway stations in Japan opened in 1925
Tobu Tojo Main Line
Stations of Tobu Railway
Yorii, Saitama